Incandescence is the emission of electromagnetic radiation (including visible light) from a hot body as a result of its high temperature.  The term derives from the Latin verb incandescere, to glow white. A common use of incandescence is the incandescent light bulb, now being phased out.

Incandescence is due to thermal radiation. It usually refers specifically to visible light, while thermal radiation refers also to infrared or any other electromagnetic radiation.

Observation and use

This limit is called the Draper point. The incandescence does not vanish below that temperature, but it is too weak in the visible spectrum to be perceptible.

At higher temperatures, the substance becomes brighter and its color changes from red towards white and finally blue.

Incandescence is exploited in incandescent light bulbs, in which a filament is heated to a temperature at which a fraction of the radiation falls in the visible spectrum. The majority of the radiation, however, is emitted in the infrared part of the spectrum, rendering incandescent lights relatively inefficient as a light source. If the filament could be made hotter, efficiency would increase; however, there are currently no materials able to withstand such temperatures which would be appropriate for use in lamps.

More efficient light sources, such as fluorescent lamps and LEDs, do not function by incandescence.

Sunlight is the incandescence of the "white hot" surface of the sun.

See also

Black-body radiation
Red heat
List of light sources
luminescence (light emission by substances not resulting from heat)

References

External links

Electromagnetic radiation
Light sources
Luminescence